Emilie Amalie Charlotte "Emmi" Bonhoeffer ( Delbrück; 13 May 1905, Berlin - 12 March 1991, Düsseldorf) was the wife of anti-Hitler activist Klaus Bonhoeffer and sister-in-law of theologian, Dietrich Bonhoeffer. She married Bonhoeffer on 3 September 1930.  

Klaus was chief counsel of the Lufthansa Airline Company and was the leading civilian member of the military resistance to the Hitler regime. While occupied with raising their children, Emmi supported her husband's decision to oppose Nazism, assisting him on countless occasions both morally and practically. Her husband was arrested in October 1944 in connection with the plot to kill Hitler. He was sentenced to death in February, 1945, and killed by the SS as the war was ending on 23 April 1945.

Emmi barely escaped her own death when her house was destroyed in the last days of the war. She moved with her children to Schleswig-Holstein to start a new life in June 1945. She was active in projects aiding war refugees, as well as anti-Nazi educational work and various humanitarian efforts.

Emmi Bonhoeffer was also the author of Auschwitz Trials: Letters from an eyewitness.

She was the sister of biophysicist Max Delbr%C3%BCck.

References

German anti-fascists
1905 births
1991 deaths
Officers Crosses of the Order of Merit of the Federal Republic of Germany
Female anti-fascists